José Ángel López Martínez (born April 25, 1994), known by his stage name Jay Wheeler, is a Puerto Rican singer and songwriter. Wheeler first became widely known after a video of him singing went viral in 2016, after which he began pursuing a career as a musician. Signing with Dynamic Records in 2018, his debut album Platónico was released the following year, executively produced by DJ Nelson. His second effort, Platónicos, again produced by DJ Nelson, was released in 2020, and contained the successful single "La Curiosidad" featuring Myke Towers, which peaked at #5 on the Billboard Hot Latin Songs chart.

Early life 

Wheeler was born José Ángel López Martínez on April 25, 1994 to a working-class family in Salinas, Puerto Rico. He first developed an interest in music as a child through singing at his local church, where he also learned to play the piano. Throughout his teenage years Wheeler stopped singing and instead began experimenting with production, after developing a fear of singing in public due to the regular bullying he suffered at school. At the age of 16, Wheeler separated from his girlfriend, an incident that inspired him to write a new song, "Ahora Estoy Mejor" and record himself singing it. After showing it to a friend, he was encouraged to post it online, where it went viral overnight, generating over 500,000 views and serving as a platform for Wheeler to seriously pursue a career as a musician.

Career

Early years (2016–2018) 
Wheeler used his newfound fanbase to continue to release music through both Instagram and Facebook, building up a steady following and earning the nickname "La Voz Favorita" (The Favourite Voice). He would later choose to go by the stage name Jay Wheeler; he asked his fans to choose a name that would go with "Jay", eventually choosing Wheeler as the best suggestion; he believed "Jay Wheeler, La Voz Favorita" just sounded right. After a steady number of releases between 2016 and 2018, Wheeler was noticed by Dynamic Records, who signed him to his first record deal. A video of Wheeler bought to tears on stage at the sight of fans singing his music went viral in 2018, and was later seen by DJ Nelson, who reached out to Wheeler and offered to be his mentor.

2019–present: Platónico, Platónicos and work with DJ Nelson 

DJ Nelson told Wheeler that he had an exact vision for him as an artist and offered to executively produce his debut studio album Platónico, released in 2019, containing the successful Otra Noche Mas remix with Farruko.

Wheeler began work on his second effort soon after, a sequel to his first album to be known as Platónicos. Released in 2020 and again produced by DJ Nelson, the album contained the hit single "La Curiosidad" featuring Myke Towers, which peaked at #5 on the Billboard Hot Latin Songs chart.

Discography 

Studio albums
Platónico (2019)
Platónicos (2020)
De Mi Para Ti (2022)
El Amor Y Yo (2022)
Emociones (2022)

References 

1994 births
People from Salinas, Puerto Rico
Puerto Rican singer-songwriters
Living people
Latin music songwriters